Risto Heikki Ryti (3 February 1889 – 25 October 1956) served as the fifth president of Finland from 1940 to 1944. Ryti started his career as a politician in the field of economics and as a political background figure during the interwar period. He made a wide range of international contacts in the world of banking and within the framework of the League of Nations. Ryti served as prime minister during the Winter War of 1939–1940 and the Interim Peace of 1940–1941. Later he became president during the Continuation War of 1941–1944. After the war, Ryti was the main defendant in the Finnish war-responsibility trials (1945–1946), which resulted in his conviction for crimes against peace.

Ryti penned the 1944 Ryti–Ribbentrop Agreement (named after Ryti and Joachim von Ribbentrop), a personal letter from Ryti to Nazi German Führer Adolf Hitler whereby Ryti agreed not to reach a separate peace in the Continuation War against the Soviet Union without approval from Nazi Germany, in order to secure German military aid for Finland to stop the Soviet Vyborg–Petrozavodsk Offensive against Finland. His resignation soon afterwards allowed his successor Mannerheim to bypass the 'personal' agreement and make peace with the Soviet Union.

Early life and career
Risto Ryti was born in Huittinen, Satakunta, one of seven sons. His parents were Kaarle Evert Ryti, a farmer, and Ida Vivika Junttila. Although he came from a peasant farming background, during his childhood Ryti hardly participated in work on the family's large farm, being a bookish and academically inclined boy. He was educated briefly at Pori Grammar School, and was then tutored at home, before enrolling in the University of Helsinki in 1906 to study law. Ryti was the only one of seven sons to pass the university entrance examination; however his three sisters also matriculated.

Ryti graduated in autumn 1909 as Finland was moving into the second period of Russification. Escaping an oppressive political atmosphere in the capital, Ryti returned to his roots in Satakunta, where he established himself as a lawyer in Rauma. During this period he became acquainted with Alfred Kordelin, one of Finland's richest men. Ryti became Kordelin's lawyer, and eventually the two men became close friends. During this period Ryti also undertook further studies, becoming a Master of Laws in 1912. In the spring of 1914 he moved to Oxford to study maritime law, but the outbreak of World War I forced him to return to Finland. In 1916 he married Gerda Paula Serlachius (1886–1984). They had three children, Henrik (1916–2002), Niilo (1919–1997), and Eva (1922–2009).

In the period after the outbreak of World War I, before Finland achieved its independence, Ryti's business relationship with Kordelin grew even closer, and it appeared likely that Kordelin would ask Ryti to become general manager of his numerous business enterprises. However, in November 1917 Ryti and his wife witnessed the murder of Kordelin at the hands of a Russian Bolshevik. Russian seamen led by a Finnish tailor took Kordelin's party hostage, with the intent to rob them. Ryti, Kordelin's lawyer, refused to legally authorize the robbery despite being threatened at gunpoint. Armed White Guard soldiers were however present and the situation deteriorated into a gunfight. 20 people including Kordelin were killed. Ryti was saved by a malfunction in the enemy's firearm.

Politician and banker

Member of parliament and finance minister 

During the Finnish Civil War Ryti played no active part, remaining in hiding with his family in Red-dominated Helsinki. Afterwards, however, he would become deeply involved in politics, being elected a National Progressive member of Parliament in 1919, at the age of thirty the second youngest member. In the same year, the party candidate, an admirer of Ryti, Kaarlo Juho Ståhlberg, was elected the first president of Finland. Ryti served as a member of Parliament from 1919 to 1924 and from 1927 to 1929. During his first few years in Parliament, Ryti served as chairman of the Judiciary Committee, and later the Finance Committee. He also served as a member of Helsinki City Council from 1924 to 1927.

According to the Finnish historian Martti Turtola, Ryti succeeded in politics in the first few years after the Finnish Civil War because his liberal, democratic, and republican ideals were popular then. Moreover, Ryti's personal political success continued even after his liberal-oriented National Progressive Party shrank to a fringe party, because he was considered an expert especially in economic policy and, very importantly, an impartial servant of the fatherland who refused to play partisan politics (see Martti Turtola, Risto Ryti:  A Life for the Fatherland).

In 1921, the thirty-two-year-old Ryti was appointed finance minister in the government of Juho Vennola. He served in that position twice until 1924. In 1923 President Kaarlo Juho Ståhlberg appointed him governor of the Bank of Finland, a post he remained in until he became prime minister in 1939. Ryti only began to exercise his duties as chairman of the Bank of Finland after he resigned as finance minister in January 1924. During his early years in parliament, Ryti succeed in bringing order to the government budget. Although he was a Ståhlbergian, Ryti did not approve of pardoning Red prisoners. In his opinion, the Reds were criminals. Ryti refused to see the social background of the Finnish Civil War.

Governor of the national bank 
In 1925 Ryti was also nominated as a presidential candidate at the age of 36. In the second round of voting, he received the most support. However, in the third round the Swedish People's Party, which held the balance, moved their votes to Lauri Kristian Relander, and Ryti lost to Relander by 109 votes to 172. Ryti's support increased over the years but was never enough in elections. During the 1930s he withdrew from daily politics, but influenced economic policies. Ryti was an orthodox supporter of classical liberal economics. He made his goal to tie the value of Finnish markka to the gold standard. Unlike many other European countries, Finland did not choose deflationary solutions under his leadership; and in 1926 the country shifted to the gold markka. However, after the Great Depression in 1929, Finland was forced to abandon the gold standard following the example of Great Britain.

In the 1920s, Ryti established international contacts with the banking world of Scandinavia, and with Great Britain and the United States. The Wall Street Journal recognized his success. In 1934 he was awarded a British honour, being created a Knight Commander of the Royal Victorian Order (KCVO) due to his great merits in Anglo-Finnish relations. He had excellent relations with the leaders of the Bank of England, due to his similar economic policies, such as the belief in the gold standard until the Great Depression, and due to his excellent command of English. In fact, Ryti could regularly telephone the Bank of England's leaders when he wanted to discuss economic or financial policies with them (see Martti Turtola, "Risto Ryti:  A Life for the Fatherland"). Ryti participated in the activities of the League of Nations as a member of many committees dealing with economic questions and monetary policy.

In the politics of the 1930s, Ryti was an important background figure. His social policy was two-minded. Ryti opposed work programmes for the unemployed and spending on assistance for poor. On the other hand, he thought that the benefits of the strong economics should be distributed evenly over the whole population, not just a few. Ryti played an important part in creating the social welfare of the late 1930s. In general, Ryti was opposed to state intervention in business and industry. He opposed Socialist economics and especially its Soviet forms. Furthermore, Ryti had experienced the Russification period and the Civil War, making him anti-Soviet. Ryti approved of neither German national socialism nor right-wing extremism, and he also opposed the Lapua movement. Ryti was an admirer of British civilisation and culture and of American free enterprise.

Prime minister and president

Ryti–Tanner government during the Winter War
Ryti had built up relations of trust with leading Social Democratic Party politician Väinö Tanner and President Kyösti Kallio. In late autumn 1939, Ryti was offered the post of prime minister, but he tried to turn down the offer. However, when the Winter War broke out on 30 November, Ryti agreed.  He took his post on 1 December. Ryti concentrated on a realistic analysis of the situation, instead of pessimism or over-optimism. He and foreign minister Tanner agreed that the war must be brought to an end as quickly as possible. They both spoke fluent English and had close contact with the Western powers.

At the beginning of the war, the Soviet Union formed a puppet government and cut connections with the Ryti–Tanner government. The Finnish Army fought defensively in battles during December 1939 and January 1940. This gained time and freedom for diplomatic manoeuvering. The Soviet Union was forced to drop the Terijoki Government and accept negotiations via Stockholm. The Western allies' planned intervention influenced the Soviet government to seek an agreement. Ryti persuaded the rest of the cabinet to settle for peace and signed the Moscow Peace Treaty on 13 March 1940. The peace agreement, in which Finland lost large land areas and faced the burden of resettling 400,000 refugees, was generally considered crushing.

From prime minister to president

Ryti had proved to be a strong prime minister, in contrast to his predecessor Aimo Cajander. President Kallio suffered a stroke in August, and also he had no great experience in foreign policy, so the heavy responsibilities of state leadership were shared by Ryti, Field Marshal C.G.E. Mannerheim, industrialist and general Rudolf Walden, and Tanner. Considering this and the fact Ryti had signed the peace treaty, Ryti became an acceptable figure for the post of president in December 1940 when Kallio resigned.

The exceptional circumstances, such as the lack of a permanent place of residence for many Karelian refugees (see Turtola, "Risto Ryti:  A Life for the Fatherland" and Virkkunen, "The Finnish Presidents II"), prevented the election of presidential electors, so a constitutional amendment was enacted by the parliament to enable the electors of 1937 to elect a successor to Kallio. Ryti was chosen with 288 votes out of 300.

On the day of his retirement, 19 December 1940, Kallio suffered a fatal heart attack during a farewell gathering; on the same day, Ryti became the holder of the presidency.

Towards German orientation

Finland's changed policy from a Scandinavian orientation up to, and during, the Winter War, to a German orientation after the Winter War, was not in the least pursued by the confirmed Anglophile Risto Ryti. He had no illusions about the true nature of Germany. Traditionally Finland had been associated with Britain by stronger commercial ties, but as the Baltic Sea was dominated by the Germans and Soviets, lost markets had to be found elsewhere, and the Germans were willing to trade.

In August 1940 Ryti also agreed to secret military cooperation with Germany. Over time it became increasingly likely that the peace between Germany and the Soviet Union would end, and the experts' opinion - even among the enemies of Germany - was that in case of invasion the Soviets could not stop the German war machine. Ryti apparently turned, step by step, to being in favour of seizing the opportunity to secure Finnish claims to areas he saw to be in the country's interests, in case the great realignment of ownership of East European territory by force were to materialize.

Thus the cooperation begun in late 1940 ultimately developed in 1941 into preparations for re-annexation of the territories lost after the Winter War, in case Nazi Germany were to realize the rumoured plans for an assault on the Soviet Union. The Continuation War, when it commenced, would also come to include occupation of East Karelia, which nationalist circles had championed since the 1910s.

Continuation War

Early success and second term 

When Germany's assault on the Soviet Union began in June 1941, Finland remained formally neutral until Soviet air raids gave an expected reason to fulfill the invasion plans some days later. Ryti made his famous radio speech after the outbreak of the Continuation War where he announced that Germany would win the war against the Soviet Union: The speech was later used against him at the War-responsibility trials. Afterwards Ryti stated he did not believe Germany would win as a whole but that its forces would defeat the Soviet Union.

Finnish troops soon regained the territory lost in the Winter War and a substantial buffer zone beyond. A considerable number of members of parliament were not excited by the idea of crossing the old borders, but obviously Ryti convinced Tanner and the Social Democrats to remain in the cabinet despite their opposition to the conquest of East Karelia. Ryti's ability to thus maintain a broad coalition government strongly contributed to morale and perceived national unity. In fact, from January 1941 to March 1943, even the far-right Patriotic People's Movement (IKL) participated in the government (see, for example, Martti Turtola, "Risto Ryti:  A Life for the Fatherland", Sakari Virkkunen, "The Finnish Presidents II", and "The Republic's Presidents 1940-1956" / Tasavallan presidentit 1940-1956).

Ryti's mandate as president was intended to extend only through the rest of Kallio's term, i.e., to 1943, but as the government could not organize elections during the Continuation War, the electors from 1937 gathered to re-elect him. This exceptional procedure was mandated by a constitutional amendment passed by the Parliament of Finland. Ryti was elected by an overwhelming majority. Ryti was willing to continue as president because he was among those who led Finland into the war, even though during the winter of 1942, both Ryti and Mannerheim had their doubts about German victory.

Attempts at peace negotiations 

Ryti wanted the government of Jukka Rangell to continue in office. However, the time had arrived for a "peace government", and it was formed after long negotiations by the chairman of the National Coalition Party, Professor Edwin Linkomies. He started preparations aimed at achieving peace with the Soviet Union in spring 1943. The Patriotic People's Movement was excluded from the government. The Soviet Union's major counter-offensive began on 9 June 1944, in a situation when Finland's relations with Germany were strained due to Finland's earlier attempts to secure a separate peace. There were speculations that a change of both government and president would ensue, but Marshal Mannerheim was unwilling to take the job of post-war prime minister even temporarily. Soon, Viipuri, the second biggest city of Finland, fell to the Red Army on 20 June.

The Finnish government tried to create a link for negotiations via Stockholm. The Soviet government replied that it was ready to negotiate, but only after an assurance that Finland would surrender unconditionally. The demand divided the Finnish government as Ryti and Tanner were in favour of replying, but Mannerheim and Linkomies opposed it. The situation was tense, as Finland was in dire need of food as well as weapons and ammunition.

Ryti–Ribbentrop Agreement 
At the same time, the German foreign minister, Joachim von Ribbentrop arrived in Finland  on an unexpected visit. He called the Finnish government to commit itself to continue to fight against the Soviet Union. In return he promised military aid. Ryti had wanted parliament to decide on the matter. Mannerheim proposed the sending of a private letter. Finally, Ryti and Mannerheim compromised. The creation of a private letter from Ryti of the kind Mannerheim had envisioned was dealt with at a meeting of the Council of State. The compromise satisfied the Germans, and they expanded their military and food assistance. The military assistance helped the Finns stop the Red Army in the battle of Tali-Ihantala. Afterwards, the letter was named the Ryti–Ribbentrop Agreement.

By mid-July the front situation was stabilized. Ryti signed a letter of resignation in which, against his will, he referred among other things to health reasons. The letter was presented to the cabinet; and it went into effect 4 August 1944. The Finnish parliament appointed Mannerheim president in early August 1944. Peace negotiations could begin again, this time from a stronger position although most territorial gains had been lost by this time. Probably neither Hitler nor any other German authorities had read Ryti's previous letter carefully enough, because Finland's decision at the start of September 1944 to end its informal military alliance or "brotherhood-in-arms" with Germany surprised and angered the Germans. Probably none of them thought that Ryti would resign soon, and thus give his successor a free hand to break ties with Germany and to start peace negotiations with the Soviet Union.

Last stages of career

War-guilt trials

After Ryti resigned from the presidency, he was reappointed governor of the Bank of Finland. Jukka Rangell stepped aside to clear the way for Ryti. In autumn 1944, he used tough measures, as he had done during the Great Depression ten years earlier, in the nation's monetary policy. The policy was to fight inflation and boost exports. However, in spring 1945 Finnish communists and the Soviet Union demanded he be tried as "responsible for the war". His defence lawyer was the former foreign minister Hjalmar Procopé.

Ryti was sentenced to 10 years imprisonment. Along with Ryti, seven other high officials were sentenced to prison, although for shorter terms. The group was convicted using an ex post facto law, which had been instituted for the purpose by the parliament. Although the Finnish constitution prohibited such legislation, the act in question was passed as a constitutional amendment, with a qualified majority in the parliament. Both the court and the parliament faced severe pressure from the Soviet Union and the United Kingdom during the process. Ryti's health failed during his sentence. Most of his stomach had to be removed due to a tumour; in addition, he developed arthritis during his first winter of imprisonment. By 1949, all the other convicts of the war-responsibility trials had been released on parole, while Ryti was hospitalized. He was pardoned by President Juho Kusti Paasikivi that year.

Final years
After being freed, Ryti never returned to public life. He concentrated on writing his memoirs but was not successful due to ill health. In 1952, he attended a university students' celebration where he accepted a badge of honour.

Although he refused to return to politics, Ryti voted regularly. In May 1956, just five months before his death, he received an honorary doctorate in political science from the Helsinki University.

Risto Ryti died in October 1956 and was buried with full presidential honors.

Post-Soviet legacy 

After the Soviet Union collapsed, Ryti's reputation was publicly, but not officially, restored. The government's position on the propositions for the rehabilitation of Ryti and his fellow convicts has been that an official rehabilitation is unnecessary as the honour of the convicted has never been lost. The idea of annulling the sentences or the act retroactively has been considered to be unnecessary and contrary to Finnish judicial practice.

In 1994, a statue of Ryti was unveiled near the Parliament House. In 2004, in the YLE TV-series Suuret Suomalaiset (Great Finns) Risto Ryti got the second highest number of votes.

Freemason and believer in Fate and spirituality 
Risto Ryti was a Freemason, but after his prison sentence, was required to give up membership in his lodge, as convicts were barred from membership. He had become a Freemason in 1924, but according to the Finnish Grand Lodge's assistant grand scribe Reijo Ahtokari, he did not very actively participate in Masonic activities. In January 1941, he appointed a fellow Freemason, Johan Wilhelm "Jukka" Rangell, as prime minister only after his secretary Lauri Puntila suggested that he do so.

Ryti did, according to some of his friends and acquaintances, strongly believe in fate. If it had not been benevolent, I would not sit here now."

One of Finland's most famous clairvoyants, Aino Kassinen, recalled in her memoirs that she met Ryti in the 1930s in Helsinki, and got the understanding that Ryti strongly believed in people's being guided by the higher divine powers, and that he strongly believed in God, and had studied theosophy and anthroposophy. Ryti's wife Gerda was a much more active spiritualist and theosophist than Ryti himself; she even claimed to have a spirit guide.

In popular culture
Ryti was played by Pertti Sveholm in the 2001 television film Valtapeliä elokuussa 1940, directed by Veli-Matti Saikkonen.

Cabinets
 Ryti I Cabinet
 Ryti II Cabinet

Honours

Awards and decorations
  : Grand Cross with Collar of the Order of the White Rose (Finland) (1940)
  : Grand Cross with Collar of the Order of the White Rose (1936)
  : Grand Cross of the Order of the Lion of Finland (1942)
  : Grand Cross of the Order of the Cross of Liberty with Swords (1940)
  : Order of the German Eagle in Gold with Star (Germany)
  : Knight Commander of the Royal Victorian Order
  : Grand Cross with Collar of the Order of Merit of the Kingdom of Hungary (18 February 1942)

Notes and references

Notes

References

Cited sources

External links

 Finnish Literature Society, Biographical Centre: Ryti, Risto (1889–1956) covered by Martti Turtola
 Helsingin Sanomat: A silent president has his say covered by Markku Jokisipilä
 
 
 Risto Ryti in The Presidents of Finland

1889 births
1956 deaths
People from Huittinen
People from Turku and Pori Province (Grand Duchy of Finland)
Finnish Lutherans
Finnish prisoners and detainees
National Progressive Party (Finland) politicians
Presidents of Finland
Prime Ministers of Finland
Ministers of Finance of Finland
Members of the Parliament of Finland (1919–22)
Members of the Parliament of Finland (1922–24)
Members of the Parliament of Finland (1927–29)
World War II political leaders
Finnish people of World War II
Prisoners and detainees of Finland
Recipients of Finnish presidential pardons
Governors of the Bank of Finland
Finnish Freemasons
Alumni of the University of Oxford
University of Helsinki alumni
Grand Crosses of the Order of the Cross of Liberty
Honorary Knights Commander of the Royal Victorian Order
Heads of government who were later imprisoned
20th-century Lutherans